Wamanrao Muranjan Madhyamik Vidyalaya & Junior College is a co-educational day school in Mulund East, Mumbai, located near city boundary. It takes 20 minutes to reach the college from Mulund station. With origins from 1955, it was the one of the most prestigious Marathi medium schools in the eastern suburbs of Mumbai. Presently, there are five different schools with a mix of private and government-aided status. The alumni consists of a number University rank holders, scholars, artists and activists. In spite of it being a Marathi medium school, a considerable number of alumni have gone abroad for studies and work, mainly in the US, UK and the Middle East.

History 
Wamarao is a group of schools operated by the parent institute Raosaheb Balaram Nyandev Thakur Vidyamandir (रावसाहेब बाळाराम ठाकूर विद्यामंदिर) trust registered in 1957. It started with a Montessori school called Bal Vikas Mandir (बालविकास मंदिर) and a primary school called Lokmanya Prathamik Vidyalaya (लोकमान्य प्राथमिक विद्यालय) ) where the medium of instruction was in Marathi language. Both the schools were located opposite Mulund railway station on Lokamanya Tilak Road. The secondary school started in the 60's when philanthropist Wamanrao Muranjan donated land for construction near Mulund railway station on Gokhale Road. Due to limited classrooms in both the buildings the schools operated in two sessions, morning session from 7.30 am to 12.20 pm and afternoon session from 12.40 pm to 5.30 pm.

For nearly 30 years the school was one of the top schools in Mumbai suburban area and was a staggeringly selective school. Being equivalent to grammar schools it focused a great deal on the Sanskrit language. Although tradition has long lapsed, the students of the school were known for being eloquent Marathi speakers. Since its inception every year the school has produced a number of merit rank holder at the 10th standard (Secondary School Certificate) Maharashtra board examination.

During its golden anniversary in the year 2004, the school moved to a new building called Shardanilayam Sankul meaning 'the complex of the goddess of knowledge, was built near Gavanpada Fire Brigade. As both primary and secondary schools had moved to the new building, the trust started an English medium school. The primary section of the Vidya Prabhodhini English School began in 2004 at the Lokmanya Tilak Road building and the secondary section started in 2009 at the Gokhle Road building. This not only ensured the use of existing properties for academic purpose but also fulfilled the increasing demand of English Medium Schools in the area.

Wamanrao Muranjan Junior College of Science and Commerce (11th to 12th Standard) started its first academic session in 2008. In 2015 a public school named Daffodil Public School opened at Gokhle Road building which is based on ICSE curriculum.

All of its schools have constantly been producing good results in both academics and extracurricular activities. The diversity of its student body has been a unique factor. Every year the institutes celebrate various religious and cultural festivals.

Details new school building 

 51 Class Rooms       . Each
 1 Library            .
 5 Laboratories         . Each
 1 Computer Lab      .
 4 Teacher's Rooms     . Each
 1 Hall              .
 1 Courtyard          .
 1 Playground         .
 1 Entrance Foyer     .
 4 Stair Cases

Academics 
Along with theoretical textbook knowledge, the school focuses on giving practical expertise on all subjects to its students. 
It has 5 laboratories of each department each of area  used by both school and college students. The laboratories are equipped with excellent apparatus and other accessories required for conducting experiments in an ideal manner. For students in technical field, the college has started electronics vocational branch and has labs enriched by the recent additions of modern equipment in Electronics etc. as required by the new syllabus. The school has a library with a diverse collection of books, periodicals and audio-visual CDs. The overall result of the first batch of HSC (12th standard board exam). Science was 86.20% and for commerce, it was 74.57% with the percentage increasing.

Extra-Curricular 
The school provides a number of extra-curricular programs. The Gymkhana concentrates on a number of Indoor and Outdoor games and such other activities as the Fine Arts in participating in the Youth Festival. The debating Union provides an opportunity for the students to participate in various debating and elocution competitions. A Gymnasium is available for students. It is well set up with modern equipment and is at the disposal of the students for enrichment of their physical culture. The Gymnasium also two tables for playing table tennis and two carrom boards. The school did not have its own playground for sports day and it used to be carried out on Railway Protection Forces ground. In the new the building the school has a large playground where students can play all kind of other games.

Notable alumni
Nitin Chandrakant Desai, Indian art director and production designer of Indian cinema who turned to film and television production.

Arjun Military Academy 
From the year 2008 under Major Gawand's guidance, Arjun Military Academy began courses. Initially, it was only for 6th & 7th class students but now 8th class students are also enrolled. Total strength of the academy has been around 96 students per year. Classes are carried out only on the Sunday Morning between 7 and 10. Daily exercise, Parade, marching, Rescue techniques, first-aid, Rappelling, River crossing, trekking is the scope of the course. The Team stood first in Kasber Academy's Parade and has achieved many other honours.

References

External links

1955 establishments in Bombay State
Educational institutions established in 1955
Mulund
High schools and secondary schools in Mumbai